Francesco Ferdinando d’Ávalos d'Aquino, 7th Marquis of Pescara, 3rd Marquis of Vasto (c. 1530 – 1571 in Palermo), was commander in chief of the Spanish army in Lombardy and Piedmont, governor of the State of Milan (1560–63) and viceroy of Sicily (1568–71).

Francesco Ferdinando was the son of Alfonso d'Avalos, VI marquis of Pescara and II of Vasto. Still a child, he was named in 1536 Gran Camerlengo of the Kingdom of Naples. At the head of the  Spanish army in Lombardy and Piedmont since December 1555, he achieved an advantageous truce with France in March 1556, concluding the successful campaign started by the Duke of Alba.

He was then Governor of the Duchy of Milan (1560–63) and viceroy of Sicily (1568–71), where he diminished the power of the local barons and the Deputation.

He also became a knight in the Order of the Golden Fleece.

In 1552 he married Isabella Gonzaga, daughter of Federico II Gonzaga. They had:
 Alfonso Felice d'Avalos d'Aquino d'Aragona (1564–1593), prince of Francavilla and his successor. 
 Tommaso d'Avalos d'Aquino d'Aragona (died 1622), count of Castelluccio, Latin Patriarch of Antioch between 1611 and 1622.

References

Sources

Further reading

Governors of the Duchy of Milan
Viceroys of Sicily
1571 deaths
Year of birth unknown
Marquesses of Spain
Knights of the Golden Fleece
Francesco